Show Champion (Korean: 쇼 챔피언) is a South Korean music television program broadcast live by MBC M every Wednesday at Bitmaru Broadcasting Center in Ilsan.

Hosts 

 Shindong (February 14, 2012 – December 25, 2012)
 Hahm Eun-jung (January 30, 2013 – August 28, 2013)
 Amber (January 30, 2013 – December 18, 2013)
 Kangin (January 8, 2014 – November 26, 2014)
 Doyoung, Jaehyun (January 21, 2015 – July 1, 2015)
 Kim Shin-young (July 8, 2015 – December 11, 2019)
 Moon Bin, Yoon San-ha, Kangmin (March 4, 2020 – October 26, 2022)
 Moon Sua, Tsuki, Nana (February 8, 2023 – present)

Chart point system 
In 2013, the show switched from a pre-recorded format to a live show format. New changes to the show started with the episode on January 30, 2013. Since 2015 it also has a Triple Crown system used in Inkigayo and The Show, where the song is not eligible for top 3 anymore after winning three times.

Starting from July 14, 2021, Show Champion revealed the scores like every other show on their website, instead of just announcing winners. The tracking time is also revealed to be from Monday to Sunday.

Every song, as long as they are in the week's pre-vote list and have not yet had a triple-crown, is eligible for this chart. Though Show Champion is a cable music show, there's no requirement for artists to attend or promote. The time limit in the pre-vote list is unknown.

Criteria that is currently used and was used in Show Champion ranking system:

Based source and explanations for each criteria

 Broadcast: Artists should participate in MBC M Shows to get Broadcast Score
 Digital sales: Number of streaming and download based on Korean chart, Currently is Melon, Genie, FLO, Bugs. Former based source included Naver Music and Soribada.
 Physical album: Number of copies based on Hanteo album chart
 Professional judges or critics' choice: Score based on judgement by MBC Music's staff
 Video views or SNS: Youtube views, counted from official MV only.
 Voting and netizen ranking: Voting and netizen choices happens before show start. Currently via Idol Champ app. Previously app and website used include Genie (until 2020), Melon (until 2018). Current pre-voting times is from Friday to Monday (previously is Thursday to Sunday).

Champion Song winners

2012 

February
 02.21 – F.T. Island – "Severely"
 02.28 – Miss A – "Touch"

March
 03.06 – Miss A – "Touch"
 03.13 – John Park – "Falling"
 03.20 – 2AM – "I Wonder If You Hurt Like Me"
 03.27 – Shinee – "Sherlock•셜록 (Clue + Note)"

April
 04.03 – Shinee – "Sherlock•셜록 (Clue + Note)"
 04.10 – CNBLUE – "Hey You"
 04.17 – 4Minute – "Volume Up"
 04.24 – 4Minute – "Volume Up"

May
 05.01 – Sistar – "Alone"
 05.08 – Girls' Generation-TTS – "Twinkle"
 05.15 – Girls' Generation-TTS – "Twinkle"
 05.22 – Girls' Generation-TTS – "Twinkle"
 05.29 – No Show

June
 06.05 – Infinite – "The Chaser"
 06.12 – Wonder Girls – "Like This"
 06.19 – Wonder Girls – "Like This"
 06.26 – f(x) – "Electric Shock"

July
 07.03 – f(x) – "Electric Shock"
 07.10 – Super Junior – "Sexy, Free & Single"
 07.17 – Super Junior – "Sexy, Free & Single"
 07.24 – Super Junior – "Sexy, Free & Single"
 07.31 – No Show

August
 08.07 – No Show
 08.14 – BoA – "Only One"
 08.21 – Beast – "Beautiful Night"
 08.28 – Kara – "Pandora"

(Starting from September 4, 2012, the ranking system was abolished but was revived later on January 30, 2013)

2013 

January
 01.30 – CNBLUE – "I'm Sorry"

February
 02.06 – CNBLUE – "I'm Sorry"
 02.13 – CNBLUE – "I'm Sorry"
 02.20 – Sistar19 – "Gone Not Around Any Longer"
 02.27 – Shinee – "Dream Girl"

March
 03.06 – Shinee – "Dream Girl"
 03.13 – Shinee – "Dream Girl"
 03.20 – Shinee – "Dream Girl"
 03.27 – 2AM – "One Spring Day"

April
 04.03 – Infinite – "Man In Love"
 04.10 – Davichi – "Turtle"
 04.17 – K.Will – "Love Blossom"
 04.24 – K.Will – "Love Blossom"

May
 05.01 – Cho Yong-pil – "Hello"
 05.08 – 4Minute – "What's Your Name?"
 05.15 – 4Minute – "What's Your Name?"
 05.22 – 4Minute – "What's Your Name?"
 05.29 – Shinhwa – "This Love"

June
 06.05 – Shinhwa – "This Love"
 06.12 – Lee Hyori – "Bad Girls"
 06.19 – Exo – "Wolf"
 06.26 – Sistar – "Give It to Me"

July
07.03 – <Mid-Year Special – No Chart>
07.10 – Dynamic Duo – "BAAAM"
07.17 – Apink – "No No No"
07.24 – Ailee – "U&I"
07.31 – Infinite – "Destiny"

August
 08.07 – f(x) – "Rum Pum Pum Pum"
 08.14 – <MBC Show Champion Sokcho Festival – No Chart>
 08.21 – Exo – "Growl"
 08.28 – Exo – "Growl"

September
 09.04 – Exo – "Growl"
 09.11 – Teen Top – "Rocking"
 09.18 – Kara – "Damaged Lady"
 09.25 – Kara – "Damaged Lady"

October
 10.02 – Busker Busker – "Love, at first"
 10.09 – Busker Busker – "Love, at first"
 10.16 – IU – "The Red Shoes"
 10.23 – Shinee – "Everybody"
 10.30 – Shinee – "Everybody"

November
 11.06 – Trouble Maker – "Now"
 11.13 – Miss A – "Hush"
 11.20 – Trouble Maker – "Now"
 11.27 – <No Chart and Winner>

December
 12.04 – Hyolyn – "One Way Love"
 12.11 – <No Chart and Winner>
 12.18 – Exo – "'Miracles in December
 12.25 – <No Chart and Winner> 2014 

 2015 

 2016 

 2017 

2018

 2019 

 

 2020 

 

2021 – present

Triple Crowns
In 2015, Show Champion introduced the triple crown system which refers to when a song achieves three wins (consecutive or non-consecutive) on the show. It is then ineligible to win again and removed from the chart.

In 2015, Show Champion introduced the triple crown system.

 Achievements by artists 
Starting from July 14, 2021; Show Champion reveal scores like every other show.

In 2015, Show Champion ended the unlimited trophy system and introduced the triple crown system.

End of the Year Awards
2015
These are special end-of-the-year broadcast awards. Winners are listed first and highlighted in bold.

 Similar programs 

Mnet M CountdownSBS InkigayoKBS Music BankMBC Show! Music CoreArirang TV Pops in SeoulArirang TV Simply K-Pop (formerly called The M-Wave and Wave K)
JTBC Music on TopJTBC Music Universe K-909SBS M The Show''

See also 
Music programs of South Korea

Notes

References

External links 
 Show Champion official website 
  

South Korean music chart television shows
Korean-language television shows
2012 South Korean television series debuts